Terry Manning is an American photographer, composer, singer-songwriter, multi-instrumentalist, record producer, audio engineer, and visual artist. In a career spanning more than 50 years, he has worked with Led Zeppelin, Iron Maiden, Bryan Adams, ZZ Top, the Tragically Hip, Zeno, Jay Boy Adams, Booker T. & the MG's, Shakira, Isaac Hayes, Otis Redding, Rhino Bucket, Johnny Winter, the Fabulous Thunderbirds, Big Star, Johnny Taylor, Jason and the Scorchers, the Staple Singers, Molly Hatchet, George Thorogood, Al Green, Widespread Panic, Shania Twain, Joe Cocker, Joe Walsh, and Lenny Kravitz, among others.

In 2013, Manning was inducted into the International Rockabilly Hall of Fame, the West Texas Music Hall of Fame, and the Bobby Fuller Four and Border Legends Cultural Center of El Paso, Texas. In October 2013, ECR Music Group released Manning's album "West Texas Skyline", a tribute to Bobby Fuller. In January 2015, ECR released Manning's album "Heaven Knows", and in 2019 ECR released a live Manning album, "Playin' In Elvis' House", recorded in Elvis Presley's first home on Audubon Avenue in Memphis.

Early years
Terry Manning was born in Oklahoma City, and started in music in El Paso, Texas. In high school Manning showed a talent for sports, and he ran track and was all-city quarterback on the football team. He attended Memphis State University (now University of Memphis), where he served as captain of the soccer team and played junior varsity basketball. Manning began working in the music industry while he lived in El Paso, where he played guitar and sang with several local bands, including sitting in with Bobby Fuller and leading the Wild Ones.

Music career
After moving to Memphis, Tennessee, Manning worked for years at both Stax Records and Ardent Studios as an engineer and producer, recording and mixing. He was a principal part of Stax owner Al Bell's production team for the Staple Singers, responsible for such hit records as "Heavy Makes You Happy", "Respect Yourself", and "I'll Take You There".

In 1970, Manning licensed release of his own solo album, Home Sweet Home, on Stax's Enterprise label, re-released with extra tracks by Sunbeam in 2006. In the mid 1980s Manning moved to London, and worked for a year at EMI's Abbey Road Studios. In 1992, he moved to Nassau, Bahamas, to partner with Chris Blackwell in Compass Point Studios, which he operated for over twenty years.

Manning's newest releases as a music artist are the ECR Music Group/Lucky Seven Records releases of his albums, West Texas Skyline: A Tribute To Bobby Fuller, released in October 2013, Heaven Knows, released in 2015, Planets, released in 2016, and his newest, Playin' in Elvis' House, released in 2019.

Photography career
Manning was interested and involved in photography almost as long as music. A close friend starting in the 1960s was William Eggleston, who served as a mentor, as well as introducing young Manning to other photographers such as William Christenberry, Diane Arbus and Lee Friedlander. Although Manning's favorite work is his "evocative urban landscapes," he has also photographed Chuck Berry, Procol Harum, Steppenwolf, Terry Reid, Jimi Hendrix, Dusty Springfield, Lenny Kravitz, and many other musical artists of the rock music genre, as both an independent and as a writer/photographer for New Musical Express. He worked as a photojournalist for NME. He photographed Martin Luther King Jr. on April 3, 1968, the day before King was assassinated.

In August 2015, Manning's photography work began showing at art galleries in several cities. Two photography books were released Scientific Evidence Of Life On Earth During Two Millennia, and Cuba Despues Del Tiempo Especial, Antes De Los Americanos, and a number of photography books and new exhibits were planned.

Personal life
Manning regularly competes in marathons, including two entries in the New York Marathon. He achieved a ranking of 19th nationally in racquetball, and worked as a racquetball instructor for several years. He completed Bachelor of Arts degrees in Political Science and History.

In 1992 Manning moved to the Bahamas with his wife Sherry Manning where he worked with Chris Blackwell at his studio. Sherry died from cancer in 2013 in Nassau. In 2017 Manning married Janet Brunton and returned to El Paso, Texas. Manning has a stepson, Cory, and three children, Lucas, Michael, and Yuri.

References

External links 
 Terry Manning's homepage
 Compass Point Studio's homepage

Year of birth missing (living people)
Living people
Record producers from Oklahoma
Record producers from Texas
American audio engineers
American photographers
Businesspeople from Texas